Massachusetts Bay is a bay on the Gulf of Maine that forms part of the central coastline of the Commonwealth of Massachusetts.

Description
Its northern and southern shores incline toward each other through the entrance to Boston Harbor, where they are about five miles apart. The westmost point of the bay is at the city of Boston.

The northern shore of Massachusetts Bay is rocky and irregular, but the southern shore is low, marshy, and sandy. Along the shores are a number of capes and headlands, and off the coast a number of small islands, especially in the entrance to Boston Harbor. The principal inlets are: on the north coast, Gloucester Harbor, Nahant Bay, Salem Harbor, Marblehead Harbor, and Lynn Harbor, and on the west, Boston Harbor, Dorchester Bay, and Quincy Bay (the two latter being part of the Outer Boston Harbor), and on the south coast, Hingham Bay. Massachusetts Bay is itself part of the Gulf of Maine, which extends from Nova Scotia south to Cape Cod Bay. Cape Cod Bay is sometimes considered to be part of Massachusetts Bay. Under this interpretation, the name "Massachusetts Bay" denotes the entire rectangular area of ocean between Cape Ann and Cape Cod.

Massachusetts Bay Disposal Site
The Massachusetts Bay Disposal Site in deep water off the coast has been used for ocean dumping, to dispose of munitions, dredged material, rock and construction debris and sunken vessels. Between 1919 and 1970 chemical warfare munitions were dumped, and after World War II hundreds of thousands of tons of surplus artillery and munitions, which are the majority of munitions washed up on shore. Most of them are inert unexploded ordnance but occasionally they are live. Fishermen have brought a torpedo into Provincetown, Massachusetts, a depth charge into Gloucester, Massachusetts and mustard munitions into New Bedford, Massachusetts.

References

External links

 

Bays of Massachusetts
Bays of Essex County, Massachusetts
Bays of Plymouth County, Massachusetts
Bodies of water of Suffolk County, Massachusetts